3-oxo-5,6-dehydrosuberyl-CoA semialdehyde dehydrogenase (paaZ (gene)) is an enzyme with systematic name 3-oxo-5,6-dehydrosuberyl-CoA semialdehyde:NADP+ oxidoreductase. This enzyme catalyses the following chemical reaction

 3-oxo-5,6-dehydrosuberyl-CoA semialdehyde + NADP+ + H2O  3-oxo-5,6-dehydrosuberyl-CoA + NADPH + H+

The enzyme from Escherichia coli is a bifunctional protein that also acts as EC 3.7.1.16, oxepin-CoA hydrolase.

References

External links 
 

EC 1.17.1